The goodness of fit of a statistical model describes how well it fits a set of observations. Measures of goodness of fit typically summarize the discrepancy between observed values and the values expected under the model in question. Such measures can be used in statistical hypothesis testing, e.g. to test for normality of residuals, to test whether two samples are drawn from identical distributions  (see Kolmogorov–Smirnov test), or whether outcome frequencies follow a specified distribution (see Pearson's chi-square test).  In the analysis of variance, one of the components into which the variance is partitioned may be a lack-of-fit sum of squares.

Fit of distributions

In assessing whether a given distribution is suited to a data-set, the following tests and their underlying measures of fit can be used:
Bayesian information criterion
Kolmogorov–Smirnov test
Cramér–von Mises criterion
Anderson–Darling test
Shapiro–Wilk test
Chi-squared test
Akaike information criterion
Hosmer–Lemeshow test
Kuiper's test
Kernelized Stein discrepancy
Zhang's ZK, ZC and ZA tests
Moran test
Density Based Empirical Likelihood Ratio tests

Regression analysis

In regression analysis, more specifically regression validation, the following topics relate to goodness of fit:

 Coefficient of determination (the R-squared measure of goodness of fit);
 Lack-of-fit sum of squares;
 Mallows's Cp criterion
 Prediction error
 Reduced chi-square

Categorical data

The following are examples that arise in the context of categorical data.

Pearson's chi-square test

Pearson's chi-square test uses a measure of goodness of fit which is the sum of differences between observed and expected outcome frequencies (that is, counts of observations), each squared and divided by the expectation:

 
where:
Oi = an observed count for bin i
Ei = an expected count for bin i, asserted by the null hypothesis.

The expected frequency is calculated by:

where:
F   = the cumulative distribution function for the probability distribution being tested.
Yu = the upper limit for class i, 
Yl = the lower limit for class i, and 
N = the sample size

The resulting value can be compared with a chi-square distribution to determine the goodness of fit. The chi-square distribution has (k − c) degrees of freedom, where k is the number of non-empty cells and c is the number of estimated parameters (including location and scale parameters and shape parameters) for the distribution plus one. For example, for a 3-parameter Weibull distribution, c = 4.

Example: equal frequencies of men and women

For example, to test the hypothesis that a random sample of 100 people has been drawn from a population in which men and women are equal in frequency, the observed number of men and women would be compared to the theoretical frequencies of 50 men and 50 women. If there were 44 men in the sample and 56 women, then

If the null hypothesis is true (i.e., men and women are chosen with equal probability in the sample), the test statistic will be drawn from a chi-square distribution with one degree of freedom.  Though one might expect two degrees of freedom (one each for the men and women), we must take into account that the total number of men and women is constrained (100), and thus there is only one degree of freedom (2 − 1).  In other words, if the male count is known the female count is determined, and vice versa.

Consultation of the chi-square distribution for 1 degree of freedom shows that the cumulative probability of observing a difference more than  if men and women are equally numerous in the population is approximately 0.23. This probability is higher than the conventionally accepted criteria for statistical significance (a probability of .001-.05), so normally we would not reject the null hypothesis that the number of men in the population is the same as the number of women (i.e. we would consider our sample within the range of what we'd expect for a 50/50 male/female ratio.) 

Note the assumption that the mechanism that has generated the sample is random, in the sense of independent random selection with the same probability, here 0.5 for both males and females. If, for example, each of the 44 males selected brought a male buddy, and each of the 56 females brought a female buddy, each  will increase by a factor of 4, while each  will increase by a factor of 2. The value of the statistic will double to 2.88.  Knowing this underlying mechanism, we should of course be counting pairs.  In general, the mechanism, if not defensibly random, will not be known. The distribution to which the test statistic should be referred may, accordingly, be very different from chi-square.

Binomial case

A binomial experiment is a sequence of independent trials in which the trials can result in one of two outcomes, success or failure.  There are n trials each with probability of success, denoted by p.  Provided that npi ≫ 1 for every i (where i = 1, 2, ..., k), then

This has approximately a chi-square distribution with k − 1 degrees of freedom.  The fact that there are k − 1 degrees of freedom is a consequence of the restriction .  We know there are k observed cell counts, however, once any k − 1 are known, the remaining one is uniquely determined.  Basically, one can say, there are only k − 1 freely determined cell counts, thus k − 1 degrees of freedom.

G-test

G-tests are likelihood-ratio tests of statistical significance that are increasingly being used in situations where Pearson's chi-square tests were previously recommended.

The general formula for G is

Furthermore, the total observed count should be equal to the total expected count:where  is the total number of observations.

G-tests have been recommended at least since the 1981 edition of the popular statistics textbook by Robert R. Sokal and F. James Rohlf.

See also 
 All models are wrong
 Deviance (statistics) (related to GLM)
 Overfitting
 Statistical model validation
 Theil–Sen estimator

References

Further reading

Statistical theory